The Ctenuchina are a subtribe of moths in the family Erebidae.

Taxonomy
The Ctenuchina were previously classified as the subfamily Ctenuchinae of the family Arctiidae.  That subfamily contained three  tribes: Ctenuchini, Euchromiini (wasp moths), and Syntomini.  The family Arctiidae was lowered in rank to the subfamily Arctiinae, and consequently, the three tribes became subtribes (with the -ina suffix).  Ctenuchina and Euchromiina were reclassified in the tribe Arctiini, while the Syntomina were raised in rank to the tribe Syntomini.

Genera 
List separated based on data from the Taxonomicon 
Cisseps
Ctenucha
Dahana

Assigned to subfamily Arctiinae.  Not assigned to a tribe.
Belemniastis
Eunomia
Isia

Assigned to tribe Arctiini.  Not assigned to a subtribe.
Belemnia

References

Natural History Museum Lepidoptera generic names catalog

External links

Edwards wasp moth, Lymire edwardsii  on the UF / IFAS Featured Creatures Web site

 
Lepidoptera subtribes